Doudou Diaw (born 30 October 1975), also known as Diaw Doudou or just Doudou, is a Senegalese football coach and former professional footballer and manager. He was most recently in charge as manager of Serie C club Fidelis Andria.

Playing career
Doudou spent his entire football career in Italy, joining Serie B club Perugia in 1997. After several experiences in the minor leagues, he signed for Serie B club Ancona in 2000, where he was noted by Bari, who signed him a year later.

After four years with Bari, in 2005 he signed with then-Serie B side Torino, and made his Serie A debut with the Granata a year later. He ended his career in 2014 after a number of seasons in the minor leagues of Italy.

Coaching career
Doudou started his coaching career in 2014 working with a football school in Bari, his city of residence. In 2017 he was hired by Serie D club Gravina as their new assistant coach, and successively promoted head coach by January 2018.

In July 2019, shortly after obtaining a UEFA A coaching licence, he was hired by his former club Bari as a youth coach, being in charge of the Under-15 side in his first season. He was successively made in charge of the Under-17 a year later, and the Under-19 Berretti side in March 2021. He was substituted by Valeriano Loseto in May 2021.

On 14 July 2022, Doudou was appointed in charge of the Under-19 team of Fidelis Andria.

On 1 November 2022, he was appointed in charge of the first team on an interim basis following the dismissal of head coach Mirko Cudini. On 17 November 2022 he was formally confirmed as permanent head coach. He was sacked on 17 January 2023, leaving Fidelis Andria at the bottom of the Serie C league.

Personal life
Doudou, a practicing Muslim, has been married since 2005 to a Catholic Italian woman from Bari, with whom he has two children (a son and a daughter).

References

External links
 Diaw's profile from Gazzetta dello Sport 
 
 

1975 births
Living people
Senegalese footballers
Senegalese football managers
A.S.D. Igea Virtus Barcellona players
A.C. Ancona players
S.S.C. Bari players
Torino F.C. players
A.C. Cesena players
U.S. Avellino 1912 players
Atletico Roma F.C. players
F.C. Matera players
Pol. Monterotondo Lupa players
Pol. Maccarese Giada players
Association football defenders
Serie A players
Serie B players
Serie D players
Expatriate footballers in Italy
Senegalese expatriate footballers
Senegalese expatriate sportspeople in Italy
Serer sportspeople
Serie C managers